The Mortimer brothers are a rugby league football family.

First generation
Hailing from Wagga Wagga, New South Wales, Australia: Chris Mortimer, Peter Mortimer and Steve Mortimer.  The brothers are best known for their relationship with the Canterbury-Bankstown Rugby League Football Club in the New South Wales Rugby League competition from the mid-1970s to the current day as players and administrators.

The three brothers played together in four grand finals for Canterbury and all represented New South Wales; Chris and Steve going on to represent Australia.  All three Mortimer brothers are life members of the Canterbury-Bankstown Bulldogs Football Club.  Chris and Steve are inductees into the Riverina Sporting Hall of Fame.

1979 Grand Final, all three brothers scored in a historic performance for the Mortimers.

A younger brother, Glen Mortimer played 27 first grade games for Cronulla between 1983-87 after starting out in the Bulldogs lower grades.

Second generation

Peter had five sons who all play rugby league. Daniel  plays for the Gold Coast Titans and Robbie was contracted to the Balmain tigers and the Parramatta Eels in 2010/2011 before moving to Brisbane to play Queensland Cup for the Redcliffe Dolphins in the Intrust Super Cup. Daniel won an NRL Grand Final in 2013 and also a World Club Challenge in 2014.

References

External links
 Steve Mortimer at RLP
 Peter Mortimer at RLP
 Chris Mortimer at RLP
 Glen Mortimer at RLP
 Daniel Mortimer at RLP

Australian rugby league players
People from Wagga Wagga
Living people
Mortimer family (Australia)
Year of birth missing (living people)